Hoo ( Flower) is a 2010 Indian Kannada-language film written and directed by V. Ravichandran. The film stars V. Ravichandran in lead role whereas Meera Jasmine and Namitha play the female leads. Prakash Raj plays a very important role in the film.

The film which is produced by Dinesh Gandhi is a remake of Vikraman's 2003 Tamil/Telugu bilingual Priyamana Thozhi/Vasantham.

Cast
 V. Ravichandran as Anand 
 Meera Jasmine as Jasmine
 Namitha as Anju
 Prakash Raj as Michael 
 Rangayana Raghu
 Sharan
 Lokanath
 Pavithra Lokesh
 Shankar Ashwath
 Chithra Shenoy

Track list

Reception 
Shruti Indira Lakshminarayana of Rediff scored the film at 2.5 out of 5 stars and says "Harikrishna's composition Sarigama.... will linger on for a while. Other songs picturised on Ravichandran and Namitha will appeal to the masses. There are also chances of a song that is picturised on Pavithra, Namita and the hero, leaving you with discomfort. Hoo is sure to appeal to Ravichandran's fans". A critic from The Times of India wrote "Ravichandran looks dull, jaded and tired. Namitha is just fit to be Bullet Prakash's pair. Meera Jasmine is excellent. Prakash Raj impresses in a brief appearance. Rangayana Raghu shines. Music by V Harikrishna is average. Camera work by G S V Seetharam is mediocre". BSS from Deccan Herald wrote "His abilities are instead limited to some heavy emotional scenes where his woebegone expression adds to the impact. Meera Jasmine is adequate; her expressive eyes and body language bring to life Jasmine effectively. Namitha as Anju, disappoints both critics and the front-benchers. Performance-wise she is restricted in a tiny role while the presentation of her ample assets leaves the seeti-wallahs panting for more".

References

2010 films
2010s Kannada-language films
Kannada remakes of Tamil films
Kannada remakes of Telugu films
Films directed by V. Ravichandran
Films scored by V. Harikrishna
Indian buddy films